Castilleja latifolia is a species of Indian paintbrush known by the common name Monterey Indian paintbrush.

It is endemic to the coastline of California between the San Francisco Bay Area and Monterey County. Its range extends from about Point Reyes to Big Sur. It is a plant of the immediate coastline, growing in sand dunes and coastal sage scrub.

Description
This wildflower is a perennial herb growing up to about 60 centimeters tall and spreading into a shrublike form as it ages over the years.

It is bristly and hairy with green, gray-green, purple or purple-tinted herbage. The fleshy leaves are rounded or oval and up to 2 centimeters long.

The inflorescence is made up of layers of greenish bracts tipped with dull to very bright shades of red, orange, or yellow. Between the bracts appear the flowers, which are often similar in coloration. The fruit is a capsule up to 2 centimeters long.

References

External links
Jepson Manual Treatment of Castilleja latifolia
Castilleja latifolia — UC Photos gallery

latifolia
Endemic flora of California
Natural history of the California chaparral and woodlands
Natural history of the San Francisco Bay Area
Flora without expected TNC conservation status